Édouard Levé (1 January 1965 – 15 October 2007) was a French writer, photographer, and painter.

Early career 
Levé was self-taught as an artist and studied business at the elite École supérieure des sciences économiques et commerciales. He began painting in 1991. Levé made abstract paintings but abandoned the field (claiming to have burned most of his paintings) and took up color photography upon his return from an influential two-month trip to India in 1995.

Books and photographs
Levé's first book, Oeuvres (2002), is an imaginary list of more than 500 non-existent conceptual artworks by the author, although some of the ideas were taken up as the premises of later projects actually completed by Levé (for example the photography books Amérique and Pornographie).

Levé traveled in the United States in 2002, writing Autoportrait and taking the photographs for the series Amérique, which pictures small American towns named after cities in other countries.  Autoportrait consists entirely of disconnected, unparagraphed sentences of the authorial speaker's assertions and self-description, a "collection of fragments" by a "literary cubist."

His final book, Suicide, although fictional, evokes the suicide of his childhood friend 20 years earlier, which he had also mentioned in "a shocking little addendum, tucked nonchalantly...into Autoportrait." He delivered the manuscript to his editor ten days before he took his own life at 42 years old.

Reception and influence
A chapter in Hervé Le Tellier's novel Enough About Love pays homage to Edouard Levé, who appears as the character Hugues Léger, and to his book Autoportrait, the introspective and fragmentary style of which is imitated in an extract of a book titled Definition.

Gérard Gavarry's book Expérience d'Edward Lee, Versailles (P.O.L., 2009) takes as its inspiration one hundred photos by Levé.

Awards and honors
2013 Best Translated Book Award, shortlist, Autoportrait

Works by Levé
Photography series
 1999: Homonymes (portraits of ordinary people with the same names as famous people)
 1999: Rêves Reconstitués
 2000–2002: Angoisse, Philéas Fogg (photographs taken around the city of Angoisse, whose name in French means "anguish")
 2001–2002: Actualités (staged and anonymized photos playing on the stereotypes of press photography)
 2002: Pornographie (clothed models in pornographic positions)
 2003: Rugby (models in street clothing posed in rugby positions sans ball)
 2003: Quotidien (newspaper or magazine photographs, restaged with actors who are anonymized and in everyday clothing against a black background)
 2003: Reconstitutions, Philéas Fogg,  (bringing together the restaged photographs of Actualités and Quotidien)
 2006: Fictions, P.O.L ("enigmatic" groups of black-clad people against a black background )
 2006: Amérique, Léo Scheer,  (photographs from American towns sharing names with world cities)
Other books
 2002: Oeuvres, P.O.L
 2004: Journal, P.O.L (playing on journalistic stereotypes in the fashion of Actualités)
 2005: Autoportrait, P.O.L; English translation 2012, Dalkey Archive Press, 
 2008: Suicide, P.O.L; English translation 2011, Dalkey Archive Press,

References

Further reading

Stéphane Girard, Plasticien, écrivain, suicidé. Ethos auctorial et paratopie suicidaire chez Édouard Levé, Paris, L'Harmattan, "Sémantiques", 2014.

External links
Galerie Loevenbruck (Levé's artistic representation): Photographs, biography, books, reviews and press
Editions P.O.L. (Levé's publisher), including a video of the author reading from Œuvres
Short essay on Levé's aesthetics, focusing particularly on Works
Written works online: Excerpt from Lorin Stein's English translation of Autoportrait (Paris Review)
Photo series Amérique
Obituary notices: Libération, by Philippe Lançon, 17 October 2007; by Jacques Morice, Télérama, 22 October 2007
Adaptations/homages by other artists: Autoportrait(s), an online graphic design tribute to Levé (Grand Prix ETPA 2010) by Anne Gardes; CQPVD, ou Ce que parler veut dire, a 2008 theatrical work by Jade Duviquet, adapted in part from Levé's Autoportrait

1965 births
2007 deaths
2007 suicides
20th-century French male artists
20th-century French male writers
20th-century French painters
French male painters
French male writers
French photographers
Painters who committed suicide
Suicides by hanging in France